The Yale Review is the oldest literary journal in the United States.  It is published by Johns Hopkins University Press.

It was founded in 1819 as The Christian Spectator to support Evangelicalism. Over time it began to publish more on history and economics and was renamed The New Englander in 1843. In 1885 it was renamed The New Englander and Yale Review until 1892, when it took its current name The Yale Review. At the same time, editor Henry Wolcott Farnam gave the periodical a focus on American and international politics, economics, and history.

The modern history of the journal starts in 1911 under the  editorship of Wilbur Cross. Cross remained the editor for thirty years, throughout the magazine's heyday. Contributors during this period, according to the Review's website, included Thomas Mann, Henry Adams, Virginia Woolf, George Santayana, Robert Frost, José Ortega y Gasset, Eugene O'Neill, Leon Trotsky, H. G. Wells, Thomas Wolfe, John Maynard Keynes, H. L. Mencken, A. E. Housman, Ford Madox Ford, and Wallace Stevens.

The current editor is Meghan O'Rourke, nonfiction writer, poet, and critic.

See also
List of literary magazines

References

External links
Official website
New Englander and Yale Review Full-text access through Cornell University Library
The Christian Spectator archive at HathiTrust
The New Englander archive at HathiTrust
The Yale review archive at HathiTrust
New Englander and Yale review archive at HathiTrust
Yale Review Records: 1911–1949.  Yale Collection of American Literature. Beinecke Rare Book and Manuscript Library.

News magazines published in the United States
History magazines published in the United States
Literary magazines published in the United States
Quarterly magazines published in the United States
Magazines established in 1819
Magazines published in Connecticut
Mass media in New Haven, Connecticut
Yale University publications
Wiley-Blackwell academic journals